Shamrocks GAA is a Gaelic Athletic Association club based in Shanbally, County Cork, Ireland. The club’s catchment area is the parish of Monkstown including the villages of Monkstown, Shanbally and Ringaskiddy. The club's complex in Shanbally is known as the Ted Hanley Memorial Park. The club fields Gaelic football and hurling teams in competitions organised by the Carrigdhoun division of Cork GAA. The club jerseys are green with a white sash.

History
The club was founded in 1898.

Achievements
 Cork Junior Football Championship Runners-Up 1931, 2016
 Cork Junior Hurling Championship Winners (1) 1904
 Cork Intermediate Football Championship Winners (1) 1923
 Cork Intermediate Hurling Championship Winners (1) 1915 Runners-Up 1909, 1910, 1914
 Cork Premier Senior Hurling Championship  Runners-Up 1916
 Carrigdhoun Junior Football Championship Winners (13)  1931, 1933, 1934, 1971, 1972, 1975, 1977, 1980, 1982, 1988, 1989, 1994, 2016
 Carrigdhoun Junior Hurling Championship Winners (5) 1959, 1963, 1980, 1981, 2005
 South-East Under 21 "A" Hurling Championship Winners (1) 1973
 South-East Under 21 "A" Football Championship Winners (3) 1967, 1980, 2004
 South-East Under 21 "B" Hurling Championship Winners (2) 1992, 2003
 South-East Under 21 "B" Football Championship Winners (3) 1999, 2002, 2017

Notable players
 Michael Prout
 Frank Kelleher - All-ireland 1919 Winner

References

External sources
 Club website

Gaelic games clubs in County Cork
Gaelic football clubs in County Cork
Hurling clubs in County Cork